Kuch Na Kaho (lit: Don't Say Anything) is a Pakistani drama serial which is based on a novel named Sabz Ruton Ka Pehla Phool by Rahat Jabeen. This serial aired on Hum TV on 31 October 2016. It airs Mondays and Tuesdays at 9:10 pm Before this, Hatheli occupied this slot but after eight episodes, it switched to Wednesdays and Thursdays 9:10 pm slot giving way to Kuch Na Kaho. It stars Naveen Waqar and Emmad Irfani in leading roles. The Serial Is Gaining Good Ratings And Popularity.

Plot 
The drama centres around a widowed mother who has two children, Sajal (Shazia Naz) and Aina (Naveen Waqar). After her sister's death, she also raised her two sons and a daughter. Faraz (Zain Mirza) and Mohsin (Emmad Irfani). Mohsin is traditional, egotistical and often infuriated and doesn't like the fact that his cousins Aina and Sajal are getting out of the house looking for a job and going to university. Mohsin is married to Nadia (Zainab Jameel) and also has a daughter. Sajal is engaged to her cousin (Faraz) and Mohsin and Faraz's sister, Aliya is married to Nadia's brother, Fahad.
  
Aina likes a boy named Imran (Asad Zaman Khan) who belongs to a very rich family. They both like each other and want to get married. However, Imran has a cousin named Annie who will do anything to marry him when she clearly knows that he likes Aina. Mohsin knew of Aina's affair and forbade Aina from university, since he was the eldest of all so nobody dare to disagree him. Eventually, Aina convinces her family to meet Imran's family. However, Imran's father wants him to marry Annie so that all the properties and money stays the same between the families. Imran's family manages to convince him that they are going to Aina's house for the proposal when in reality he is getting engaged to Annie. Realising that he has been fooled by his family, Imran tries to confront Aina's family but is sent away.

Things take an interesting turn when Imran's father threatens to divorce his mother if he does agree to marry Annie. Aina and Imran decide to meet at a park and he tells her about the divorce and Aina leaves him. Aina brokenheartedly agreed on engagement with Noman (Arsalan Faisal). But deep inside she couldn't forget Imran and therefore she met Imran again and both of them decided to get marry secretly. Sajal and Faraz happily got married and started living a happy married life. Faraz. being opposite of his brother Mohsin was much mild person with no ego issues convinces Mohsin and Aina's  mother to let Aina continue with her studies. Aina manages to convince her fiancé to delay the wedding because she wants to continue her studies when in reality she is also meeting Imran. Annie gets suspicious with Imran when he is always out the house. She then catches Aina and Imran red-handed. Annie told everything to Imran's father who abandoned him and Imran started living at his friend's place. Problems started arising among Imran and Aina when both of them started facing financial issues  imran started thinking that Aina is using him for granted. Later imran got pressurized from his father and he divorced aina. Soon aina found that she is pregnant. Soon Faraz discovered and reacted ao fiercely that Aina's mother had a heart attack and on her death bed she asked Faraz to take care of Aina and Sajal and not to tell about Aina to anyone. Aina's mother died. Her death was quite mysterious which provoked Mohsin and Nadia but Faraz started ignoring his brother and Nadia in order to hide Aina's pregnancy. Sajal after her mother's death turned out so cruel and venom-spewing sister to Aina. As Aina didn't want an abortion and therefore Faraz decided to end Aina's engagement with Noman and left for Islamabad along with his wife and Aina. This filled Mohsin with great rage and he abandoned Faraz, who decided that to deliver Aina's baby and pretend him as his and Sajal's. Unfortunately Sajal found her pregnant. Sajal blamed all the situation to Aina and Aina called Imran's mother to adopt his upcoming child as she can't keep him. Sajal had a miscarriage and followed barren life while Imran's mother told Imran about his child, who now is married to Annie. Meanwhile, Imran called Aina but a maid attended the call and told Imran that madam had a miscarriage. Imran assumed it for Aina and decided to forget Aina closing her chapter. Soon Aina gave birth to a baby boy whom Sajal quickly adopted and tried to keep Aina away from her son. Mohsin and Nadia were expecting twins now and Faraz decided to meet Mohsin and Nadia and to end this misunderstanding between them. Sajal and Faraz left for Karachi along with Maaz (Aina's son). Mohsin showed rude behaviour to Faraz who returned to Islamabad. Aina decided to overcome her problems and sorrows and to lead a normal life and started a job as a teacher.

Their lives were going well when suddenly Mohsin called upon Faraz to Karachi due to Nadia's bad health. Faraz decided to stay in Karachi now along with Sajal and Aina staying at Mohsin's place. Nadia died and gave birth to a daughter and a son. This left Mohsin with great sorrow who regret over his cruel and selfish behavior towards his late wife. Aina started taking care of Mohsin's daughter but Mohsin was the same man with great rage and ego towards everyone especially Aina. Noman (Aina's ex-fiancé) met Aina and desired of marrying her, Aina avoided Noman since she was not able to start a normal life with anyone. Noman requested Mohsin and Sajal and both of them wanted to get rid of Aina convinced Aina to marry Noman. Aina in order to get rid of situation told about her affair to Noman after knowing about Aina's affair Noman rejected Aina. This filled Mohsin and Sajal with huge anger and both of them taunted and teased Aina. Faraz on the other side decided to leave for America with Sajal and Maaz but kept this secret. Aina on the other side was constantly taunted by Mohsin and Sajal. Faraz's unending care for Aina as a younger sister raised Sajal with doubting of affair between them which hurt both Faraz and Aina who eventually bumped onto tears and anger and became furious in the rain where she yelled at Mohsin as well and claimed everyone as cruel people. The next morning Sajal apologized Faraz for doubting him while Faraz told everyone that he is leaving for America along with family.

This made Aina worried as she thought that her son Maaz is going so far and how will she live with Mohsin. On the other side Mohsin became worried as well and requested Faraz not to go and asked about Aina over this Faraz offered Mohsin to marry Aina for the sake of his children. This shocked Mohsin and he rejected stating that this is quite impossible for him as he never considered aina in his life. Faraz and Sajal tried to convince Aina who reluctantly agreed over an agreement that Faraz would not leave for America. This shocked Mohsin as he wondered about Aina's agreement over his proposal but Mohsin disagreed over proposal.

Meanwhile, Imran and Annie lived in devastating relationship which made realize Imran that he couldn't forget Aina. Incidentally Annie met Aina in a mall and told her that Imran has totally forgotten her and that he is happily married. Aina reacted firmly over this by stating  she is living a happy life as well without Imran and that she is going to marry soon, and that she will spit on Imran's face next time she'll meet him. Annie was shocked over it and told Imran sarcastically who fiercely asked Annie to leave his home. On other side Aina intensively asked Mohsin to marry her and that she will take good care of his children but Mohsin disagreed and stated that he can't start a life with her as this is quite awkward for him, but deep inside Mohsin still thought that his children wants a mother's affections. Later on the nanny Nafeesa whom Mohsin hired to look after his children was kidnapping his daughter and Aina saved her so Mohsin agreed to marry her. Imran managed to meet Aina and asked for apology Aina slapped Imran claiming that he is coward. After their marriage Mohsin started thinking of her dead wife Nadia and thinks that he is doing wrong with her Faraz tried to convince Mohsin that he should live a happy life with Aaina but Mohsin's behaviour is rude with Aaina and he often humiliate aina for being a lazy wife and compares her to Nadia. Aina tries hard to become a hardworking housewife and mother but Mohsin is always unsatisfied and often loses his temper over her. He knows that not only the children need the support of Aina but he also needs as well as Aina also needs Mohsin. He doesn't want to scold her, but often does.

Meanwhile, Faraz and Sajal decide to go to America knowing that Aina told them not to go and that is why she married Mohsin but Faraz tries to explain Aina that Sajal wants to live in America and he doesn't want to upset her. After so much of pressure she agrees to let them go but she is not happy about it. Since they left Aina is always thinking about Maaz and couldn't concentrate on anything and also she doesn't talks to Mohsin. Faraz calls Mohsin and asks if everything is okay he says that he doesn't know what happened to Aina Faraz then says Mohsin to take care of her and don't repeat the same mistake of the behaviour he kept with Nadia and says that if something happens to Aina he won't forgive himself. Mohsin couldn't take the behaviour of Aina anymore so he told Aina that why is she running away from him and why doesn't she accept this marriage then Aina hugs him and tells him she couldn't live like this, her loneliness will kill her. After saying that she faints and then Zubaida comes and scolds Mohsin for not taking care of Aina she tells him to call the doctor and the doctor says her blood pressure is low. After that he was remembering the old Aina that how joyful she used to be and now whatever he says to her she doesn't says a word.

The next day Mohsin prepared breakfast for Aina and took her very nicely. Mohsin brought his twin children and told Aina that he don't want a child right now from her maybe later but not that time because he doesn't want Aina to take care of her child more than his children. Aina has now too many responsibilities so she asked Mohsin that she wants a maid. At first he didn't agree because of all that Nafeesa drama he didn't want to take anymore risks but later on he accepts. The next day Aina was happy because she got support of maid and told Mohsin that she works really nicely and told that she cooks also very well and then Mohsin told that the maid prepared the food and she told yes I was checking that if she can cook or not because if there is any emergency so she will cook. Then he got angry and started shouting at her and told her this is his house and whatever he says only that will happen and he doesn't wants to eat the food if it is made by the maid and said her what does she even do every day. After that Ayna said that yeah I am not doing anything every day angels are coming and taking care of the house and I am doing nothing and just sleeping she said that in anger and ran furiously down the stairs and then her foot slipped and then she fell down. Then Mohsin came and helped her. After that he had to eat the food by maid the whole week. Ayna started to feel jealous seeing Nadia and Mohsin wedding picture and then she removed it from the wall and put the frame of her children. Mohsin noticed it and then got angry and said to put the frame back she said she will not put the frame and if he does she will throw the frame outside she told that I am your wife now Nadia I nowhere in her life. After a few days, Ayna went to her old home and was remembering her good old memories with Sajal and her mother. Mohsin arrived home and was waiting for Ayna when she came he told her where are you going every day at this time and saying bad stuff to her. She then says that she doesn't want to live with her and then he says cause you want to marry I mean and then she says you are a very cheap person and then she leaves the home. She then went to Zubaida (Khala) home and said her everything what happened. After that she left her home and went again back to her old home i.e.. her mother's home and was crying there. On The other hand, Mohsin was thinking that why he scolds her every time he then was imaging a shadow of himself in which his shadow says him that he have to control himself otherwise he and his children will not be happy without her. Then he visits Zubaida's house and asked her about Ayna. She said that she went to her home and then he says she is not there. Then he thought that Ayna would must be in her old house and then he goes there and convinces her and apologize her and then she agrees to live with him.

The story then leaps 18 years. The twins (Rania (Hina Altaf) and Aasher (Agha Jarrar) and Tabinda (Mariyam Nafees) have matured.  Tabinda is shy and sweet while Rania is much the opposite and Rania is lively and confident. Tabinda wants to become an engineer and study in university however Mohsin denies as he doesn't want her end up doing the mistakes Aina did in the past when she went college. Tabinda tries to convince Mohsin but Mohsin's decision remains the same. Also Mohsin is planning to get Tabinda married but Tabinda does not agree. But as usual, what Mohsin wishes only that will happen. After few days, Mohsin and Faraz's sister Aliya (Zainab Qayyum) and her son Afaaq (Umer Naru) moved to Mohsin's house to stay there forever. Afaaq is a really selfish and irresponsible guy, Aliya is also not a really good woman. The next day, Aliya said to Mohsin that Ayna is a really good woman and she took a really good care of the kids to which Mohsin agrees then Ayna came inside and she sat on the sofa then Aliya asked Mohsin that why he didn't allow Tabinda to take admission in University. He then told her that she has grown older so he is looking for a boy to marry her. After that Aliya asked hand in marriage for Tabinda to Mohsin to which Mohsin was really happy and finally agreed. After that Ayna told Mohsin that he should have asked her point of view. Then Mohsin says I don't need to listen and that why is she not agreeing for Afaaq to which Ayna replied because he has just shifted here and they don't know him much and Tabi will also not agree. Then Mohsin says if Tabi doesn't agree then he will finish all his relations between his daughter and Ayna. Mohsin also decided that Rania will marry Maaz and Taabi will marry Afaaq to which Rania overheard and then she ran to Taabi and told her about what Mohsin says that she will marry Afaaq and when she heard that she cried a lot then Ayna was calming her down and told her not to cry. The next day, when Ayna gave tea to Mohsin, he asked how Taabi responded when she learned that she will marry Afaaq. Ayna said she was quiet. Meanwhile, Afaaq was happy to marry Taabi because he thought that then he can get money  from Mohsin because he is going to be his son-in-law.

While, Maaz (Raees Alam) is unaware of fact that he is step-son of Sajal and Faraz. Once, he comes to Aina's home, Aina initially don't know that he is Maaz, but when he says that he is Maaz, she is surprised. He has actually come without permission of Sajal but Faraz knows. Rania and Maaz start taking interest in each other and would marry in coming episodes. Initially Mohsin was not in favour of his son to get education from abroad but when he asked Affaq about it, Affaq also favour his (Mohsin's) son because he wanted to handle all the business of his father-in-law. while on the other side Faraz and Sajjal return to Pakistan and Sajjal is not happy with the soft behavior of Maaz towards Aina. Whereas Maaz has fallen in love with Rania. Sajjal continuously insults Rania and Maaz gave her choice of court marriage. Aina listens there conversation and thought Rania is going to do same mistake as Aina did in past Faraz gave proposal of Maaz to Rania parents though which Aina rejected. Maaz and Rania are is great sorrow and Sajal is quite happy. But Maaz began to hate his own mother after this. He then returned to America. 
 
When Sajal apologizes to Aina and Sajal wants Rania and Maaz to marry each other, when they found out they were so surprised, at Taabi's mehndi a girl threatens Taabi to stay away from Afaqq, she zoomed to Afaqq's prison of the house and gives him the photos, Aliya was shocked to see the photos. At the shaadi the boys were dancing (Maaz, Asher, and Afaqq) when the police arrived and took Afaq, when Mohsin blames Aliya for her sons misbehavior, they decide to replace Taabi's Shaadi With Rania's marriage. Then Mohsin finds out Maaz is not Faraz and Sajal son but does not know it is Aaina and tells Rania to divorce him. Maaz comes in and he tells Rania to go with him but Mohsin gets a gun out just to threaten Maaz but out of pressure Aaina tells Mohsin about Imran and Maaz being her son. Mohsin is shocked and Faraz tries to take the gun off and then Mohsin accidentally shoots Maaz. Aaina and Faraz take him to the hospital and gets him treated. Rania on the other hand is in a state of shock and Tabi tries to console her and says he is fine and is asking about her. Mohsin is thinking about what he has done and remembers about his past. When Aina is back to home to take Rania to hospital to see Maaz, Mohsin tells about the fact that Aina is not their mother. Despite this, they accepted her as their mother. Maaz went to meet his father and grandmother they were shocked and aina went back to Mohsin. At least Taabi and Afaq married and Rania and Maaz as well they had a family picture and that was the ending.

Cast 
 Naveen Waqar as Ayna "Aani" 
 Emmad Irfani as Mohsin  
 Asad Zaman Khan as Imran
 Shazia Naz as Sajal
 Mirza Zain Baig as Faraz 
 Hira Hussain as Annie 
 Maryam Nafees as Tabinda "Taabi" 
 Hina Altaf as Rania
 Raeed Muhammad Alam as Maaz
 Zainab Jameel as Nadia (dead)
 Huma Nawab as Nayyara (dead)
 Abid Ali as Sohail (dead)
 Umer Naru as Afaaq 
 Ismat Zaidi as Zainab
 Zainab Qayyum as Aliya
 Agha Jararuddin as Aashir
 Fouzia Mushtaq as Zubaida 
 Shahid as Noman  
 Neema Alam
 Zainab Fatima (child actor) as the young Tabinda "Taabi"
 Rashida Tabassum

See also 
 List of programs broadcast by Hum TV
 2016 in Pakistani television

References 

Pakistani drama television series
2017 Pakistani television series debuts
2017 Pakistani television series endings
Urdu-language television shows
Hum TV original programming